The Provisional Democratic Government (Greek: Προσωρινή Δημοκρατική Κυβέρνηση, Prosoriní Dimokratikí Kyvérnisi) was the name of the administration declared by the Communist Party of Greece on 24 December 1947, during the Greek Civil War. The government controlled various mountainous areas along Greece's northern border, adjoining the communist states of SFR Yugoslavia and Albania, and was seen as the succession of the World War II-era "Mountain Government" of the Communist-led EAM-ELAS Resistance movement. Its main allies were the USSR and the Eastern Bloc.

History
The Greek Civil War had broken out in spring 1946, but it was not until June 1947 that the Greek Communists announced their intention to form a separate government. This move was announced by leading Party member Miltiadis Porfyrogennis at the Congress of the French Communist Party, in a move designed to garner publicity and highlight the support of other Communist parties and governments to the Greek Communists' cause. The formation of a separate government was not only a renunciation of any chances of reconciliation with the royal government in Athens, but also implied also a move away from guerrilla warfare towards a more "regular" structure. This was in accordance with the Yugoslav-inspired "Lakes Plan", which envisaged the creation of a regular army of 50,000–60,000 men and the occupation of large parts of northern Greece, ultimately including Greece's second city, Thessaloniki, where the new government would base itself.

The new government's formation was announced on 23 December 1947, with Markos Vafiadis, the leader of the Communists' Democratic Army of Greece (DSE), as its first chairman. The government was composed exclusively of Party members, with Giannis Ioannidis serving as Vice Chairman and Foreign minister, Petros Rousos as Justice Minister, Miltiadis Porfyrogennis as Health and Welfare Minister, Petros Kokkalis as Finance Minister, Vassilis Bartziotas as Agriculture Minister, Dimitris Vlantas as Minister of National Economy and Leonidas Stringos as Minister of Supply. Notably, Party General Secretary Nikolaos Zachariadis was not a member of the government. The new government actively tried to present itself as a revival of the ideology and practices World War II-era National Liberation Front, which had dominated the Greek Resistance movement. It was also notable for its active protection of the minorities living in northern Greece, especially as these tended to support the Communists against the nationalist royal government.

On 25 December, the DSE attacked the town of Konitsa, intending to seize the city as the new government's headquarters. According to testimony by Vafiadis, Zachariadis had expressed the hope that if the city fell and became the Communists' capital, the PDG would be recognized by the Soviet Union and other Eastern Bloc states. The attack lasted until 4 January 1948, but ended in failure. In the end, the PDG was never recognized by any government, because the Soviets feared a widening of the conflict into general warfare between the West and their satellite states in the Balkans. Soviet premier Joseph Stalin told Zachariadis in February 1948 that the neighbouring governments would only recognize the PDG after other countries had first done so.

As the national government pushed the DSE back in 1948, Vafiadis clashed with Zachariadis over the pursuit of the war. Finally, he was ousted from his position as PDG chairman on 7 February 1949, and Zachariadis himself assumed the position until 3 April 1949, when he was succeeded by Dimitrios Partsalidis. Following defeat by government forces in the Battle of Grammos, the Provisional Democratic Government was defeated in the Civil War and left Greece on 28 August 1949. The PDG survived in exile until they were finally dissolved in October 1950.

References

Greek Civil War
Communist Party of Greece
1940s in Greek politics
Political history of Greece
States and territories established in 1947
1947 establishments in Greece
States and territories disestablished in 1949
1949 disestablishments in Greece
Former unrecognized countries
Former socialist republics
Provisional governments